The Pool Forge Covered Bridge is a covered bridge that spans the Conestoga River in Lancaster County, Pennsylvania, United States.  The bridge is now on private property where it was once used as a storage barn before the owner added a road to receive vehicle traffic.

The bridge has a single span, wooden, double Burr arch trusses design with the addition of steel hanger rods.  It is painted entirely red, the traditional color of Lancaster County covered bridges on the outside.  The inside of the bridge is not painted.  Both approaches to the bridge are painted in red without any of the traditional white paint.

The bridge's WGCB Number is 38-36-01.  Added in 1980, it is listed on the National Register of Historic Places as structure number 80003510.  It is located at  (40.12967, -75.97683).

It is included in the Poole Forge historic district as a contributing structure.

History 
The bridge was built in 1859 by Levi Fink and Elias McMellen.

Dimensions 
Length:  total length
Width:  total width

Gallery

See also 
Burr arch truss
List of crossings of the Conestoga River
List of Lancaster County covered bridges

References

Further reading 

Bridges completed in 1859
Covered bridges on the National Register of Historic Places in Pennsylvania
Bridges over the Conestoga River
Covered bridges in Lancaster County, Pennsylvania
National Register of Historic Places in Lancaster County, Pennsylvania
Road bridges on the National Register of Historic Places in Pennsylvania
Wooden bridges in Pennsylvania
Burr Truss bridges in the United States